"Eden House" is a 1970 television play from the Australian television series Australian Plays, based on the 1969 play of the same name by Australian author Hal Porter. The played toured the UK in the 1970s with Jean Kent, and Dermot Walsh in leading roles. It was retitled 'Home on the Pigs back.'

Plot
An aging actress, a widow called Maxine, is haunted by the memory of a son who drowned. Her stepson wants her property. She has a younger lover, Mark.

Cast
 Margo Lee as Maxine
 John Bonney as Mark 
 Pat Bishop as Portia
 Diana Davidson as Kate
 Lyn James as Honor
 Don Pascoe as Victor
 Philippa Baker as Helen
 Jeff Kevin as Bernie

Production
It was taped at the ABC Studios in Gore Hill Sydney on March 16 to March 19, 1970. Carl Schultz was one of the cameramen.

References

External links
 
 1970 TV adaptation at AustLit
 Eden House play at AustLit
 Copy of script for 1970 version at National Archives of Australia

1970s Australian television plays
1970 television plays
1970 Australian television episodes
Australian Plays (season 2) episodes